The 1986 Hong Kong Urban Council and Regional Council elections were the municipal elections held on 6 March 1986 for the elected seats of the Urban Council for Hong Kong Island, Kowloon and New Kowloon and newly created Regional Council for the rest of the New Territories respectively.

Overview
15 seats in the Urban Council remained the directly elected by the general residents and 15 appointed by the Governor. For the newly formed Regional Council, 12 seats were directly elected and 9 seats were elected by the New Territories District Boards members, with 12 appointed members and 3 ex officio members of the Chairman and two vice chairmen of the Heung Yee Kuk. The first-past-the-post voting system was used.

Total of 362,725, which shared 27 per cent of the voters cast their votes on the election day on 6 March, 143,888 of which voted (35.9 per cent turnout) in the Regional Council and 218,837 of them (23.2 per cent turnout) voted in the Urban Council, slightly higher than the 1983 Urban Council Election.

Among 12 incumbent Urban Councillors, only veteran Brook Bernacchi of the Reform Club of Hong Kong and Chow Wai-hung of the Hong Kong Civic Association failed to be re-elected. The oldest elected Urban Councillor was Elsie Tu who was already 72 years old, while 64 years old Kwong Ping-yau was the oldest Regional Councillor. For the Regional Council, 10 out of 27 councillors elected were social workers, while there were also 7 education workers.

The grassroots organisation Hong Kong People's Council on Public Housing Policy (PCPHP) had candidates it supported being elected Kwun Tong, Sham Shui Po, Shau Kei Wan and Wong Tai Sin while the other new political groups such as the Hong Kong Affairs Society and Meeting Point had both victories and defeats in different areas.

General results

|-
!style="background-color:#E9E9E9;text-align:center;" colspan=2 rowspan=2|Political affiliation 
!style="background-color:#E9E9E9;text-align:center;" colspan=3 |Urban Council
!style="background-color:#E9E9E9;text-align:center;" colspan=3 |Regional Council
!style="background-color:#E9E9E9;text-align:center;" colspan=3 |Total
|-
! style="background-color:#E9E9E9;text-align:center;" |Popularvotes
! style="background-color:#E9E9E9;text-align:center;" |Standing
! style="background-color:#E9E9E9;text-align:center;" |Elected
! style="background-color:#E9E9E9;text-align:center;" |Popularvotes
! style="background-color:#E9E9E9;text-align:center;" |Standing
! style="background-color:#E9E9E9;text-align:center;" |Elected
! style="background-color:#E9E9E9;text-align:center;" |Popularvotes
! style="background-color:#E9E9E9;text-align:center;" |%
! style="background-color:#E9E9E9;text-align:center;" |Totalseatsgained
|-
|style="background-color:" |
| style="text-align:left;" |Hong Kong People's Council on Public Housing Policy || 33,038 || 4 || 4 || 14,795 || 2	 || 2 || 47,833 || 13.58 || 6
|-
|style="background-color:" |
| style="text-align:left;" |Hong Kong Civic Association || 44,027 || 9	|| 3 || 400	|| 1 || 0 || 44,427 || 12.60 || 3
|-
|style="background-color:" |
| style="text-align:left;" |Meeting Point || 17,013 || 2 || 1 || 18,398 || 2 || 1 || 35,411 || 10.06 || 2
|-
|style="background-color:" |
| style="text-align:left;" | Reform Club of Hong Kong || 24,486 || 5 || 2 || - || - || - || 24,486 || 6.95 || 2
|-
|style="background-color:" |
| style="text-align:left;" |Hong Kong Affairs Society || 15,377 || 3 || 1 || 3,953 || 1 || 0 || 19,330 || 5.49 || 1
|-
|style="background-color:" |
| style="text-align:left;" |Individuals and others || 75,527 || 16 || 4 || 119,925 || 35 || 10 || 195,452 || 55.50 || 14
|-
|style="text-align:left;background-color:#E9E9E9" colspan="2"|Total (turnout: 26.9%)
|style="text-align:right;background-color:#E9E9E9"|209,468
|style="text-align:right;background-color:#E9E9E9"|39
|style="text-align:right;background-color:#E9E9E9"|15
|style="text-align:right;background-color:#E9E9E9"|142,676
|style="text-align:right;background-color:#E9E9E9"|40
|style="text-align:right;background-color:#E9E9E9"|12
|style="text-align:right;background-color:#E9E9E9"|352,144
|style="text-align:right;background-color:#E9E9E9"|100.00
|style="text-align:right;background-color:#E9E9E9"|27
|}

Elected members

Urban Council

Regional Council

References

Hong Kong
1986 in Hong Kong
Urban and Regional
1986 elections in British Overseas Territories
March 1986 events in Asia